Jorge Molina is a comic book artist best known for his works at Marvel such as Spider-Geddon.

Career 
Molina showed a big passion in comics since an early age and dreamed of working on anything related to drawing super heroes.
Molina, being started working in the industry  has done video games, comics, clothing design and product design for companies like UDON, Image, Top Cow, DC Comics, Crystal Dynamics, ROCK STAR and Buzz Monkey.

In 2018, Molina began drawing  Spider-Geddon with writer Christos Gage.

Bibliography 
Amazing Spider-Man #1.4 (Marvel, 2016)
Avengers: The Initiative  #34 (Marvel, 2010)
A-Force #1-4 (Marvel, 2016)
Spider-Geddon #1-2, 4-5 (Marvel, 2018)
Star Wars #23 (Marvel, 2016)
Thor #5-6 (Marvel, 2014)
X-Men Blue #1-3, #13-15, #23-25, #31 (Marvel, 2018)
X-Men: Manifest Destiny - Nightcrawler  #1 (Marvel, 2009)
X-Men: Legacy #248 (Marvel, 2011)
What If? Secret Wars #1 (Marvel, 2008)
World War Hulks: Spider-Man & Thor #1-2 (Marvel, 2010)
Wolverine and the X-Men Annual #1 (Marvel, 2013)

Covers only
Avengers Assemble #19-21 (Marvel, 2013)
Generations: Wolverine & All-New Wolverine #1 (Marvel, 2017) 
Spider-Geddon #3 (Marvel, 2018)
New Mutants #34 (Marvel, 2009)

References

External links

Jorge Molina on Twitter

Living people
1984 births
Mexican comics artists